Suntowers is a high-rise building complex in the Chatuchak District, Bangkok, Thailand. The complex consists of Tower A,  Ericsson headquarters (40 floors), and Tower B (32 floors)

Transportation
 Mo Chit Station (Sukhumvit Line of the BTS Skytrain)
 The planned Ha Yaek Lat Phrao Station of the northern BTS extension will be the closest station when built.
 Chatuchak Park MRT Station, MRT Blue Line

Nearby
 Union Mall
 Chatuchak Park
 Chatuchak weekend market
 Central Plaza Lat Phrao
 JJ Mall

References

External links
 Suntowers

Skyscrapers in Bangkok
Chatuchak district